Sir James Rankin, 1st Baronet (25 December 1842 – 17 April 1915) was a Conservative Party politician in the United Kingdom. He was Member of Parliament for Leominster from 1880 to 1885, and from 1886 until the general election of 1906, losing the seat by only 28 votes to the Liberal candidate. He regained the seat in January 1910 and resigned in March 1912. He was made a Baronet on 20 June 1898, of Bryngwyn (Bryngwyn Manor, near Wormelow Tump), Herefordshire. He was a senior partner of the family timber and shipbuilding company, Pollok, Gilmour and Company. The Rankin Constitutional Club, in Corn Square, Leominster, is named after him.

Personal

Born on 25 December 1842, he was the eldest son of Robert Rankin (1801–1870), a timber merchant and shipowner, and his wife Ann, née Strang (1812–1875). He earned a first-class degree in the Natural Science Tripos at Trinity College, Cambridge.

On 12 January 1865, he married Annie Laura, the daughter Christopher Bushell J.P. (1810–1886) and Margaret née Easton of Hinderton Hall, Cheshire. He had four sons and four daughters. His Baronetcy was created in 1898.

See also
Rankin baronets

References

Bibliography

John Rankin, A history of our firm: being some account of the firm of Pollok, Gilmour and Co. and its offshoots and connections, 1804–1920, publ. 1921

External links
"England and Wales Census, 1881 for James Rankin" at familysearch.org

 
 Sir James Rankin (1842–1915), Bt, portrait painted in 1907 by Herman Herkomer
 

1842 births
1915 deaths
Conservative Party (UK) MPs for English constituencies
Masters of foxhounds in England
Baronets in the Baronetage of the United Kingdom
UK MPs 1880–1885
UK MPs 1886–1892
UK MPs 1910
UK MPs 1910–1918